The University of Cebu (UC) is a private, non-sectarian, coeducational basic and higher education institution in Cebu City, Philippines. It was founded in 1964 offering preschool, grade school, junior & senior high school, undergraduate degrees, and post-graduate degrees. It currently has five campuses.

History
A group of young men headed by lawyer Augusto W. Go, formed an alliance and set up an educational institution of what was then called the Cebu College of Commerce, then later renamed Cebu Central Colleges (CCC). Starting with a handful of enrollees, the college was established in 1964. It grew over time and became the University of Cebu.

The University of Cebu has been recognized by the Philippine Association of Colleges and Universities Commission on Accreditation (PACU-COA).

Campuses
The university currently has five campuses spread across Metro Cebu:
Main Campus along Sanciangko St. and J. Alcantara St., Cebu City
Banilad Campus along Gov. M. Cuenco Ave., Banilad, Cebu City
Lapu-Lapu and Mandaue Campus (LM) (near the border of Lapu-Lapu City and Mandaue) situated near the foot of the Mactan–Mandaue Bridge, along A.C. Cortes Ave., Looc, Mandaue
Maritime Education and Training Center (METC) Campus, also known as Mambaling Campus, along Alumnos St., Mambaling, Cebu City
Pardo–Talisay (PT) Campus (formerly the St. Paul College Foundation, Inc.) along N. Bacalso Ave., Bulacao Pardo, Cebu City

Another campus, the former UC South Campus also along Sanciangko St., was demolished and replaced by an expansion of UC's sister company Elizabeth Mall (E-Mall).

References
University of Cebu - Cebu City, Philippines

External links
Official website
UC.net website
Official website of St. Paul College Foundation, Inc.

See also
College of Technological Sciences–Cebu
Lourdes Libres Rosaroso

Universities and colleges in Cebu City
Educational institutions established in 1964
1964 establishments in the Philippines